Bartolomé Pou (1727–1802) was a Spanish erudite and writer.

Works

Bartholomew Pou published several books, some are named, others are with pseudonyms or anonymously declared. Highlights include:
Entertainments rhetorical and poetic at the Academy of Cervera, three speeches and a tragedy entitled Hispania captures;
the Bilbilitanae Theses, printed in 1763 in Calatayud with the title of philosophiae historiae Institutionum libri duodecim;
Life of Venerable Berchmaus;
apologetic four books of the Society of Jesus, written in Latin, with the name of Ignacio Philaretos;
two books in memory of Laura Bassi, Latin and Greek, philosophy of the Academy of Bologna;
the translation of the nine books of the History of Herodotus ;
Pastors Relief, Castilian, and a Compendium of Logic, two booklets, if not entirely his own, at least were corrected by him.

External links
 
 

Spanish male writers
18th-century Spanish Jesuits
1727 births
1802 deaths